Nestor Hervé Djengoue (born 26 April 1991) is a Cameroonian footballer who plays for German side Phönix Lübeck. He made his professional debut for Chievo in 2010–11 Coppa Italia.

Biography

Youth career
Born in Cameroon, Djengoue spent one season with Internazionale's Allievi Nazionali youth team where he played as a midfielder. However, he also played as a fullback occasionally. Before hemoved to Inter, he played for Veneto side Noventa Calcio and was selected for the Allievi regional representative team in 2007, winning the trophy with Veneto. Inter signed him for around €40,000 to €50,000. When Inter released Djengoue on 1 September 2008, made Inter had to write-down the non amortised contract value of around €32,000.

He moved in 2008 to Chievo, another Veneto team, for free along with team-mate Daniele Co and Paolo Marchi (loan), re-joining former team-mate Nicola Piras. Djengoue was a full-back for its Primavera team but also played as a centre-back. In the first season, Marchi occupied one of the fullback spots and in the second season Andrea Bertin, another Inter youth product.

Chievo
In the 2010–11 season, he made his debut in Coppa Italia, in which he played twice. In the 2011–12 season, Djengoue was an overage player for the Primavera. That season he changed to wear no.26 shirt (from No.91) for the first team.

Djengoue also played for the first team in a pre-season friendly as a centre-back. He was only able to play once for Chievo in the 2011–12 Coppa Italia as right-back. That cup match both teams fielded inferior players and Chievo won 3–0. Djengoue failed to enter the squad in the next round against Udinese, which Chievo qualified again.

References

External links
 Sky Italia Profile 
 

1991 births
Footballers from Douala
Living people
Cameroonian footballers
Inter Milan players
A.C. ChievoVerona players
F.C. Lumezzane V.G.Z. A.S.D. players
FSV Frankfurt players
NK Zagreb players
FC Energie Cottbus players
1. FC Phönix Lübeck players
Croatian Football League players
2. Bundesliga players
3. Liga players
Regionalliga players
Association football defenders
Cameroonian expatriate footballers
Cameroonian expatriate sportspeople in Italy
Expatriate footballers in Italy
Cameroonian expatriate sportspeople in Croatia
Expatriate footballers in Croatia
Cameroonian expatriate sportspeople in Germany
Expatriate footballers in Germany